Rebecca Maddern (born 6 August 1977) is an Australian television presenter and journalist.

Biography

Maddern is currently weekend presenter of Seven News Melbourne with Mike Amor and presents Seven Afternoon News in Melbourne.

She has worked at Seven Network for over a decade, where she was a presenter and reporter for Seven News and also presented a variety of programs and events across the network.

Maddern has previously worked at the Nine Network, where she was a host of Weekend Today, host at the Australian Open for Nine's Wide World of Sports and co-host of Australian Ninja Warrior. She is the former co-host of The Footy Show which she originally signed with the network to do.

Career
Maddern started off her career in radio after she completed a Bachelor of Arts in Media Studies from the RMIT University in 1999. Later she became a sports reporter for Melbourne radio station Triple M, whilst there she worked alongside some of the top media personalities of Australia. In 2001, Rebecca began reading the Fox FM afternoon news reports and, at the beginning of 2002, moved to Nova 100 to read the breakfast news during the inaugural year of Hughesy, Kate and Dave.

Seven Network 
In October 2002, Maddern joined the Seven Network after being offered reporting position by the news director. It was there in her first year of television reporting, she won a prestigious Quill Award for her coverage of Victoria's January 2003 bushfires.

In September 2005, Maddern was appointed presenter of Seven Afternoon News replacing David Johnston until the bulletin moved to the network's Sydney studios.

In January 2013, Maddern returned to present Seven Afternoon News with production moving back to Melbourne again replacing Samantha Armytage. However, in August 2013 she was replaced by Melissa Doyle and Matt White.

In March 2014, Maddern joined Sunrise as Melbourne correspondent replacing Nick Etchells. In recent years, Maddern had reduced duties on Seven News as a senior reporter due to her Sunrise commitments. She remained with Sunrise until her move to the Nine Network. Nathan Templeton replaced her as Melbourne correspondent.

Nine Network 
In March 2016, the Nine Network announced that Maddern would co-host the AFL Footy Show.

In November 2016, Maddern was announced as the host of Australian Ninja Warrior which aired on the Nine Network in July 2017.

In August 2018, it was announced that Maddern would host the network's tennis coverage. It was also announced that she will not be returning to the AFL Footy Show.

In December 2019, the Nine Network announced that Maddern would replace Allison Langdon as host of Weekend Today.

Maddern has also hosted Nine's coverage of the 2019 Cricket World Cup and 2019 Ashes Series in England.

In November 2021, it was announced that Maddern had resigned from the Nine Network after being unable to agree on contractual terms.

Return to Seven Network 
In January 2022, it was announced that Maddern will return to the Seven Network where she will present Seven News Melbourne with Mike Amor on weekends and presents Seven Afternoon News Melbourne by replacing Jacqueline Felgate.

On 12 January 2022, leaked footage from Seven News revealed Maddern referring to tennis player Novak Djokovic as a “lying, sneaky arsehole”, in an off-air conversation with Mike Amor. This conversation was sparked by Djokovic’s recent release from detention by the Federal Circuit and Family Court of Australia.

Personal life
In October 2006, Maddern married Geelong real estate identity, James Wilson. They have since divorced.

Maddern was named as the ambassador for the Geelong Cup in 2007.

In 2011, Maddern was named the number one ticket holder for the Geelong Football Club

In March 2014, Maddern married Seven News cameraman Trent Miller. Miller is now a cameraman for GTV-9, and also provides his services to the AFL Footy Show.

References

External links
Profile at Yahoo7

1977 births
Living people
RMIT University alumni
Australian women journalists
Australian women television presenters
Australian game show hosts
Nine News presenters